"Don't Play That Song Again" was the  entry for the Eurovision Song Contest 2000.  The song was performed by Nicki French, already a well-known name, having had a worldwide hit in 1995 with a cover of Bonnie Tyler's "Total Eclipse of the Heart": on the night she wore a lilac trenchcoat over a bright purple two-piece outfit.

Background
The song's composer John Springate had in 1994 produced French's first recording of "Total Eclipse of the Heart" – which preceded her 1995 hit recording – and Springate had asked French to perform "Don't Play That Song Again" to vie at Song For Europe 2000 where the song came first in a field of four with total televotes of 47,355.

At Eurovision
The scoring for Eurovision 2000 began with "Don't Play that Song Again" receiving a single point from the first reporting jury (that being ): subsequently "Don't Play That Song Again" was awarded points by only seven of the twenty-one (not counting the UK) remaining juries with both the Maltese and the  jury responding best to "Don't Play That Song Again" by awarding it six points. At the close of the voting "Don't Play That Song Again" had accrued a vote tally of 28 points to earn sixteenth place in a field of twenty-four – the worst ever result for a UK entry up to that time.

Charts
"Don't Play That Song Again" reached No. 34 on the UK Charts, the lowest chart placing for a British Eurovision entry since 1989.

References 

Eurovision songs of the United Kingdom
Eurovision songs of 2000
2000 songs
Nicki French songs